Shahida Rauf (born 15 January 1977) is a Pakistani politician who was a Member of the Provincial Assembly of Balochistan, from 2002 to May 2018.

Early life and education
Rauf was born on 15 January 1977 in Quetta.

She holds the degree of the Bachelor of Science which she obtained in 1998.

Political career

Rauf was elected to the Provincial Assembly of Balochistan as a candidate of Muttahida Majlis-e-Amal on a reserved seat for women in 2002 Pakistani general election. She served as Advisor to Chief Minister of Balochistan on Health from 2002 to 2007.

She was re-elected to the Provincial Assembly of Balochistan as a candidate of Jamiat Ulema-e Islam (F) (JUI-F) on a reserved seat for women in 2008 Pakistani general election.

She was re-elected to the Provincial Assembly of Balochistan as a candidate of JUI-F on a reserved seat for women in 2013 Pakistani general election.

References

Living people
Balochistan MPAs 2013–2018
Women members of the Provincial Assembly of Balochistan
Balochistan MPAs 2002–2007
1977 births
Balochistan MPAs 2008–2013
21st-century Pakistani women politicians